Poland competed at the 2014 Winter Olympics in Sochi, Russia, from 7 to 23 February 2014. The Polish team consisted of 59 athletes in 11 sports, which was the largest ever Polish team, surpassing the 56 athletes that competed in 1972. With 4 gold medals won (and 6 medals overall), this was the most successful Winter Olympics for Poland in its history.

Medalists

Alpine skiing 

According to the quota allocation released on 20 January 2014, Poland qualified six athletes.

Men

Women

Biathlon 

Based on their performance at the 2012 and 2013 Biathlon World Championships, Poland qualified 5 men and 5 women.

Men

Women

Mixed

Bobsleigh 

Poland had two sleds in qualification position.

* – Denotes the driver of each sled

The Four Man Bobsleigh Sled was Disqualified.

Cross-country skiing 

According to the quota allocation released on 20 January 2014, Poland qualified eight athletes.
Distance
Men

Women

Sprint
Men

Women

Freestyle skiing 

According to the quota allocation released on 20 January 2014, Poland qualified one athlete.

Ski cross

Luge

Poland achieved the following quota places:

Nordic combined 

According to the quota allocation released on 20 January 2014, Poland qualified one athlete.

Short track speed skating 

Poland qualified one skater for the women's 500 m and 1000 m events for the Olympics during the two World Cup events in November 2013.

Women

Qualification legend: ADV – Advanced due to being impeded by another skater; FA – Qualify to medal round; FB – Qualify to consolation round

Ski jumping 

According to the quota allocation released on 20 January 2014, Poland qualified five athletes.

Snowboarding 

According to the quota allocation released on 20 January 2014, Poland qualified five athletes.

Alpine

Freestyle

Qualification Legend: QF – Qualify directly to final; QS – Qualify to semifinal

Snowboard cross

Speed skating 

Based on the results from the fall World Cups during the 2013–14 ISU Speed Skating World Cup season, Poland earned the following start quotas:

Men

Women

Team pursuit

See also
Poland at the 2014 Summer Youth Olympics

References

External links 
Poland at the 2014 Winter Olympics

Nations at the 2014 Winter Olympics
2014 Winter Olympics
Olympics